Xenu, or Xenu's Link Sleuth, is a computer program that checks websites for broken hyperlinks. It is written by Tilman Hausherr and is proprietary software available at no charge.  The program is named after Xenu, the Galactic Ruler from Scientology scripture.

Format
Link Sleuth runs on Microsoft Windows. Link verification is performed on links which appear in <a> tags, as well as images, frames, plug-ins, backgrounds, local image maps, style sheets, scripts and Java applets. The program follows links to other pages, and checks the links on those pages also, so it is possible to check an entire site for broken links in one session. Xenu displays a continuously updated list of URLs which can be sorted according to different criteria. The program uses a "simple, no-frills user-interface", and can help users understand how certain Web sites are structured. The program has support for SSL Web sites.

Reception
Xenu's Link Sleuth software was called the "fastest link-checking software" by PC Magazine, and "amazingly fast, very accurate" by a University of Wyoming newsletter. The software was used as a testing tool in a usability study at Grand Valley State University.

References

External links

 Xenu's Link Sleuth, Project home page

Windows-only freeware
Web software
Hypertext